Joseph Ignatz Sadler (17 February 1725 – 9 January 1767) was a Czech painter.

Life
Sadler was born in Olomouc, and primarily painted religious-themed frescoes. acting especially in Moravia, for example the frescoes on the ceiling of the church of the Holy Trinity Church, Fulnek. He was the brother-in-law of the painter Johann Christoph Handke. He was of German minority ethnics in Moravia.

Further reading
 Hail, George; Breedlove, Martin; Mlčák, Leos, et al. Josef Ignaz Sadler 1725-1767 Art Museum Olomouc - Olomouc Archdiocesan Museum, Gallery: 18 May - 28 August 2011. Olomouc Olomouc Museum of Art. 143 pp. .
 Schenk, Marie; Olšovský, Jaromír. Baroque painting and sculpture in the western part of Czech Silesia. Opava: Silesian Museum, Francis Maj, 2001. 274 pp. .
 Proceedings of the Philosophical Faculty of the Brno University Art Series (F), 18, 1969, # 13
 Kratinová, V. painting of the 18th century in Moravia, the Moravian Gallery. Brno 1988. - Product Exhibition.
 Toman, P. New Dictionary of Czechoslovak artists. Second L - Ps. Ostrava 1993.

Czech painters
Czech male painters
1725 births
1767 deaths
Artists from Olomouc
Moravian-German people
Fresco painters